Fraser Wishart (born 1 March 1965) is a Scottish former professional footballer, former Secretary of the Scottish Professional Footballers' Association, and current chief executive of the Professional Footballers' Association Scotland. He is also an occasional radio and television commentator.

Early life
Johnstone-born Wishart grew up in south Glasgow, attending Hillpark Secondary School, where he played in the school team.

He began his football career with Eastercraig Boys' Club, a successful youth team in Glasgow, followed by spells at amateur club, Giffnock North and semi-professional giants, Pollok Juniors.

Playing career
Wishart signed with Scottish Premier Division team Motherwell in 1983, and under manager Tommy McLean he established himself as a regular full back, making over 150 appearances for the team over the next six years.

In 1989, he was transferred to St Mirren for £285,000, an amount set by tribunal after the two clubs could not agree on a fee. Three years later he moved to Falkirk, before enjoying the most high-profile period of his career when Walter Smith signed him for Glasgow Rangers in 1993. However, he made only nine appearances for the club in the next two years before moving on to Hearts in 1995, followed by a second spell at former club Motherwell in 1996.

He was transferred to Clydebank in 1997, where he spent four years both as a player and coach during the club's turbulent final seasons. By this point Wishart was already working at the players' union as assistant to Tony Higgins. From Clydebank, he then moved to the similarly troubled Airdrieonians in 2001.

References

External links

1965 births
Living people
People from Johnstone
Scottish footballers
Motherwell F.C. players
St Mirren F.C. players
Falkirk F.C. players
Rangers F.C. players
Heart of Midlothian F.C. players
Clydebank F.C. (1965) players
Airdrieonians F.C. (1878) players
Scottish Football League players
Scottish chief executives
Footballers from Renfrewshire
Dumbarton F.C. players
Association football defenders
Scottish sports executives and administrators
Scottish trade unionists
Presidents of British trade unions
Clydebank F.C. (1965) non-playing staff